Simon O'Brien (born 19 June 1965 in Garston, Liverpool, Merseyside) is a British television actor and radio presenter as well as a property developer.

Career
He came to prominence as the character Damon Grant in Brookside, a role he played from the soap's launch in 1982 until 1987, when his character was killed off in York at the end of the 'soap bubble' Damon and Debbie. In 1989, Simon starred in the British version of Jim Henson's Fraggle Rock until 1990. He portrayed the Lighthouse Keeper called BJ in the much acclaimed musical puppet TV series.

In the 1990s, after a spell presenting BBC football show Standing Room Only and a regular role on the American sitcom Out All Night, he left show business and, with Alan Bate, set up Liverpool Cycle Centre, a combination of vegetarian café, cycle shop, cycle parking and other resources relevant to his enthusiasm for cycling. O'Brien then moved into property development. He has since returned to acting and presenting, with a short-lived football quizshow, Do I Not Know That?, on ITV Digital, co-presenting the BBC One show To Buy or Not to Buy, as well as playing caretaker Wally Scott in Grange Hill from 2003.

O'Brien presented BBC Radio Merseyside's Breakfast show with Lucinda Moore from September 2006 until 25 June 2007, when he resigned after the accidental broadcast of a promotional preview clip of a forthcoming radio show of him saying "fuck the government, fuck the planners". In 2014, O'Brien began presenting the TV reality series My Dream Derelict Home, before moving on to Find it, Fix it, Flog it in 2016 with fellow presenter Henry Cole, for Channel 4.  

In 2022, it was announced that O'Brien would appear on the ITV soap opera Coronation Street as guest character Frank Bardsley.

Personal life
In 2014, O'Brien was appointed chair of the Liverpool Green Strategy Group.  He and his wife Liz, a teacher, have one daughter.

References

External links
 
 Official website

1965 births
Living people
English male television actors
English radio presenters
Male actors from Liverpool
People from Garston